Gauja Valley is a valley of the Gauja river in Latvia, which is 1 to 2.5 km wide, and the maximum depth near Sigulda is 85 m. The valley is the main constituent of the Gauja National Park founded in 1973.

The valley started forming approximately one million years ago in the Quaternary glaciation period. 
The final formation of the valley occurred during a last period of glacial activity 10,000 to 20,000 years ago. The glaciers melted and covered the territory of Latvia several times, and the melting waters settled in the terraces of the valley and transported field stones, gravel, and clay.

Geographically, the Gauja valley played a role during the Livonian Crusades due to its existing network of waterways and land roads ( of Livonia). The valley was also home to a variety of ethnic groups who each controlled their own lands (Livonians, Ydumea people, Letts and Vends). During the 13th century several new stone castles of the Livonian Order (Sigulda Medieval Castle, Cēsis Medieval Castle, Valmiera Castle) and the Archbishop of Riga (Turaida Castle) were built here.

See also 
 Gauja Formation

References

Natural monuments of Latvia
Valleys of Latvia